The Heinkel HD 37 was a fighter aircraft, designed in Germany in the late 1920s, but produced in the USSR for Soviet Air Force service. It was a compact, single-bay biplane with staggered wings of unequal span, braced by N-type interplane struts. The pilot sat in an open cockpit, and the main units of the tailskid undercarriage were linked by a cross-axle.

Design and development
It had been designed for the clandestine air force that the Reichswehr was training at Lipetsk, but had been rejected by German officials, who purchased the Fokker D.XIII instead.

The Soviet Air Force was experiencing a crisis with the obsolescence of its main fighter, the Polikarpov I-5, with no replacement apparently forthcoming from domestic manufacturers. When Heinkel was approached to provide an alternative, the firm was able to offer the HD 37, and the two prototypes were flown to Moscow in early 1928. Flight testing produced mixed results. While the basic design was apparently sound, Soviet test pilots reported many deficiencies in handling, and Heinkel was presented with a long list of complex changes to be made. Heinkel responded with the HD 43, and when the same Soviet test pilots found that they liked it even less than the HD 37, attention shifted once again to the previous design by the end of 1929. Early the following year, the Soviet government bought a licence to manufacture the type for the next three years, paying Heinkel 150,000 Marks for it. Manufacturing was carried out by TsKB (Tsentrahl'noye konstrooktorskoye byuro - central construction bureau) and Polikarpov, given the designation I-7.

Many of the improvements that had been adopted in the creation of the HD 43 were eventually implemented in the I-7 as well, along with other modifications, and by the time the first examples flew in summer 1931, flight test results were positive. Despite on-going difficulties in obtaining materials, 131 examples were produced by 1934. Most of these served briefly with units in Belarus, but by the time the last examples were leaving the factory, the type was already obsolete.

Variants
HD 37a 1 built.
HD 37b 1 built.
HD 37c The third sub-series, produced under licence by Polikarpov after adaptation by TsKB (Tsentrahl'noye konstrooktorskoye byuro - central construction bureau): 132+ built.
Polikarpov I-7 The licence-built HD 37c adapted by TsKB by fitting a Mikulin M-17F engine, PV-1 machine guns and Soviet radio.

Operators

Soviet Air Force

Specifications (I-7)

References

Further reading

 

1920s German fighter aircraft
HD 37
Single-engined tractor aircraft
Biplanes
Aircraft first flown in 1928